Lichonycteris (Little long-tongued bat) is a genus of bats in the family Phyllostomidae. Its members are native to South America.

Species
L. degener (Miller, 1931): Pale brown long-nosed bat
L. obscura (Thomas, 1895): Dark long-tongued bat

References

Phyllostomidae
Taxa named by Oldfield Thomas
Bats of South America